Břve is a village and administrative part of Hostivice in the Central Bohemian Region of the Czech Republic.

History
Břve was first mentioned in 1184.

Geography
There is the Břevský Pond in the village.

References

Neighbourhoods in the Czech Republic
Populated places in Prague-West District